is a series of roguelike video games. Most of the titles were developed by Chunsoft; other titles were developed by different companies with permission from Chunsoft to use the trademark. Koichi Nakamura, founder of Chunsoft and co-creator of the Dragon Quest series, conceived the Mystery Dungeon series as Chunsoft's first original work, basing the design on the game Rogue. Most Mystery Dungeon games center on exploring a dungeon with randomly generated layouts and fighting other characters in those dungeons in a turn-based manner; every time the player performs an action, such as attacking or walking, the opponents also take action.

The first game, Torneko no Daibōken: Fushigi no Dungeon (1993), stars Torneko, a shopkeeper character from Chunsoft's Dragon Quest IV. The games of the Mystery Dungeon series can be largely divided into five groups: those related to the Dragon Quest series; the Shiren the Wanderer series; those related to the Chocobo series, itself a spinoff of the Final Fantasy series; those related to the Pokémon franchise; and individual spin-off games of other franchises. Of the games, only the Shiren series are based on original characters rather than those of other franchises. The Mystery Dungeon games have had varying levels of success. Of them, the Pokémon games have had the biggest impact, with the first game in the subseries selling millions of copies. Chocobo's Mysterious Dungeon also sold over one million copies.

Games

Dragon Quest series

Shiren the Wanderer series

Chocobo series

Pokémon series

Etrian Odyssey series

Individual releases

References

External links

Final Fantasy

Lists of video games by franchise